{{Infobox Christian leader
| honorific-prefix = His Excellency, The Most Reverend
| name = Timothy Paul Broglio
| honorific-suffix = 
| archbishop_of = Archbishop for the Military Services, USAPresident of the United StatesConference of Catholic Bishops
| image = Archbishop of the Military Services visits ROK 150826-F-BX159-001.jpg
| caption = Bishop Broglio in 2015
| province = 
| church = Roman Catholic Church
| archdiocese = Military Services, USA
| see = 
| appointed = November 19, 2007
| enthroned = January 25, 2008
| ended = 
| predecessor = Edwin F. O'Brien
| successor = 
| ordination = May 19, 1977
| ordained_by = Sergio Pignedoli
| consecration = March 19, 2001
| consecrated_by = John Paul II  Angelo Sodano  Giovanni Battista Re
| other_post = 
| previous_post = Apostolic Nuncio to the Dominican Republic(2001-2007)Apostolic Delegate to Puerto Rico (2001-2007) Titular archbishop of Amiternum (2001-2007)
| birth_name = 
| birth_date = 
| birth_place = Cleveland Heights, Ohio, US
| death_date = 
| death_place = 
| buried = 
| nationality = 
| religion = Roman Catholic
| residence = 
| parents = 
| spouse = 
| children = 
| occupation = 
| profession = 
| alma_mater = Boston CollegePontifical Gregorian UniversityPontifical Ecclesiastical AcademyPontifical North American College
| signature = 
| coat_of_arms = 
| motto = Quaerite regnum Dei''(Seek God's kingdom)
| module2 = 
| education = 
}}Timothy Paul Andrew Broglio''' (born December 22, 1951) is an American prelate of the Roman Catholic Church. He has served as Archbishop for the Military Services, USA, since 2008, and as president of the United States Conference of Catholic Bishops since 2022. Broglio previously served as  Apostolic Nuncio to the Dominican Republic and Apostolic Delegate to Puerto Rico from 2001 to 2008.

Broglio has gained attention for his opinions on LGBT personnel serving in the US military and for homosexuality being a root cause of the church sexual abuse scandal.

Biography

Early life 
Timothy Broglio was born December 22, 1951 in Cleveland Heights, Ohio and attended St. Ignatius High School. After graduating from high school, Broglio attended Boston College where he obtained a Bachelor of Arts degree in classics.

Broglio entered the Pontifical Gregorian University after graduating from college and earned a Bachelor of Sacred Theology degree while residing at the Pontifical North American College.

Priesthood 
Broglio was ordained to the priesthood for the Diocese of Cleveland by Cardinal Sergio Pignedoli on May 19, 1977. Broglio then served as an associate pastor at St. Margaret Mary Parish, in South Euclid, Ohio, later remarking that the assignment was "the best two years of [his] life".

Returning to Rome in 1979, he studied at the Pontifical Ecclesiastical Academy and graduated in 1983; He also earned his Doctor of Canon Law degree from the Gregorian, and joined the Vatican’s diplomatic corps. After serving as secretary for the nunciatures to the Ivory Coast (1983-1987) and to Paraguay (1987-1990), Broglio worked at the Vatican Secretariat of State as desk officer for Central America.  He then served as personal secretary to Vatican Secretary of State Cardinal Angelo Sodano.

Apostolic Nuncio and Delegate 
On February 27, 2001, Broglio was appointed apostolic nuncio to the Dominican Republic, as well as apostolic delegate to Puerto Rico, and titular archbishop of Amiternum. He received his episcopal consecration on March 19, 2001, from Pope John Paul II, with Cardinals Angelo Sodano and Giovanni Battista Re serving as co-consecrators. His consecration, and the days leading to it, were recorded and used by National Geographic in their 2001 documentary, "Inside the Vatican."

Archbishop of the Military Services, USA

Pope Benedict XVI named Broglio head of the Archdiocese for the Military Services, USA on November 19, 2007. He was installed on January 25, 2008, at the Basilica of the National Shrine of the Immaculate Conception. During his tenure, Broglio has publicly voiced opposition to the Affordable Care Act's contraceptive mandate and the repeal of Don't Ask Don't Tell, and showed support for the Trump administration's ban on transgender individuals serving in the United States military.

USCCB President 
On November 15, 2022, at the fall Plenary Assembly of the United States Conference of Catholic Bishops, Broglio was elected USCCB president. 

Aside from his native English, Broglio is fluent in Italian, Spanish, and French, and is a board member of Catholic Distance University.

Viewpoints

COVID 19 vaccine exemptions 
In October 2021, Broglio released a statement supporting the military's granting of exemptions from COVID-19 vaccination mandates on the basis of service members' conscience-based objections.

LGBT personnel in the military 
Broglio opposed the repeal of Don't Ask Don't Tell policy from 1993 to 2011 that regulated service by LGBT personnel in the US military. He also supported the Trump administration's ban on transgender individuals serving in the military. In 2013, Broglio opposed the Pentagon granting the same benefits to same-sex married couples as to other married couples.

Sex abuse scandal 
In response to a letter from a military spouse complaining about a homily delivered in a base service, Broglio wrote:“There is no question that the crisis of sexual abuse by priests in the USA is directly related to homosexuality,” Broglio wrote. “[Ninety percent] of those abused were boys aged 12 and over. That is no longer pedophilia.”

Honors
  Chaplain Grand Cross of Merit of the Sacred Military Constantinian Order of Saint George

See also

 Catholic Church hierarchy
 Catholic Church in the United States
 Historical list of the Catholic bishops of the United States
 List of Catholic bishops of the United States
 Lists of patriarchs, archbishops, and bishops
 United States military chaplains

References

External links

 Archdiocese for the Military Services, USA Official Website
Catholic-Hierarchy
 Archdiocese for the Military Services of the United States. GCatholic.org. Retrieved 2010-08-20.

1951 births
Living people
Religious leaders from Cleveland
Roman Catholic Diocese of Cleveland
20th-century American Roman Catholic priests
21st-century Roman Catholic archbishops in the United States
Apostolic Nuncios to the Dominican Republic
Apostolic Nuncios to Puerto Rico
Pontifical Ecclesiastical Academy alumni
Pontifical Gregorian University alumni
Roman Catholic archbishops for the United States Military Services
People from Cleveland Heights, Ohio